Auguste Keufer (20 April 1851, Sainte-Marie-aux-Mines – 30 March 1924, Paris) was a French typesetter and syndicalist. He was the first treasurer of the Confédération générale du travail (CGT)

Biography
Orphaned at an early age, Keufer experienced poverty in his youth. He trained as a typographer with the printers Haut-Rhin Jardel.

References

1851 births
1924 deaths
Positivists